XHQO-FM is a radio station on 90.7 FM in Cosamaloapan, Veracruz, known as QO Romance.

History
XEQO-AM 980 received its concession on November 11, 1972. It broadcast with 5,000 watts and was owned by Zoila Muñoz de Aguirre. The family still owns the station today.

XEQO moved to FM in 2012 as XHQO-FM 90.7.

References

Radio stations in Veracruz
Radio stations established in 1972